The National Care Service (NCS) is a proposed publicly funded system of social care in the United Kingdom which was partially introduced by the Labour government of Gordon Brown in 2010 but abandoned soon after when the coalition government of David Cameron came to power in May 2010. Similar to the National Health Service, it would be free at the point of need and paid for through taxation. The Labour Party has continued to propose the creation of an NCS while in opposition, and has done so under each consecutive leader since Ed Miliband's leadership in 2010.

Since 2021, the proposal has been adopted by the devolved governments of Scotland and Wales, with plans for the service to be fully operational in Scotland by 2026, and a plan for its implementation in Wales expected by the end of 2023.

Background 
The Labour government of Clement Attlee introduced a publicly funded system of health care with the establishment of the National Health Service (NHS) in 1948. The NHS covered social care until 1976, when most social care services were transferred to local authorities. Since then, most people have had to pay for social care, with publicly funded social care still available to those who pass a means test in which examinees must prove a lack of wealth and a high need for care. Publicly funded social care is also offered to some adults with "long-term complex health needs" through the NHS continuing healthcare scheme.

History

England and Wales 
The Department of Health under Andy Burnham released its green paper Shaping the Future of Care Together in July 2009, which proposed a new National Care Service "on par with the NHS". This was followed by a public consultation in September called the "Big Care Debate", which was promoted by Prime Minister Gordon Brown as a "crucial national debate". The consultation found a public desire for social care reform and explored different ways to introduce the NCS. The government decided to introduce the NCS gradually and in different stages, with the first stage beginning with the Personal Care at Home Act 2010. This Act legally extended to England and Wales.

The Act was passed by parliament in April 2010, with the NCS being launched a month earlier by Health Secretary Andy Burnham, giving all elderly and disabled people free social care. The second stage was planned to begin from 2014 and would extend free social care to people who were in residential care for more than two years. A third and final stage would fully introduce the NCS, giving all adults free social care after 2015. However, the Labour government lost the May 2010 general election and the Conservative–Liberal Democrat coalition came to power. The coalition abandoned the NCS and the Personal Care at Home Act 2010 was later repealed.

In opposition, the Labour Party under the leadership of Ed Miliband (2010–2015) continued calling for the introduction of an NCS that would give elderly and disabled people free social care. Under Jeremy Corbyn's leadership (2015–2020), the party promised to introduce the NCS in its manifestos for the 2017 and 2019 general elections, once again proposing free social care for all adults and also free personal care for the elderly. It is also supported by leader Keir Starmer (2020–present), who is planning to introduce it as a needs-based, locally-delivered system should Labour enter government. His Shadow Health Secretary Wes Streeting has launched a review by the Fabian Society to see how it would operate and be funded, and aims to gradually introduce it over two or three terms of a Labour government, with a long-term aspiration of introducing the service on par with the NHS.

The devolved Labour-led government of Wales is exploring options for a Welsh NCS as part of its 2021 cooperation agreement with Plaid Cymru, with a plan for its implementation expected by the end of 2023. The Welsh branch of Labour has been supporting the NCS since the 2021 Senedd election.

Scotland 
Scottish Labour has been calling for the implementation of a Scottish NCS since 2011, with party leader Iain Gray (2008–2011) negotiating the proposal with civil servants in 2010. The Scottish Conservatives supported the proposal, as did the Scottish National Party (SNP) government's then-Health Secretary Nicola Sturgeon, however Sturgeon and the SNP government ultimately rejected the proposal.

An independent review into Scottish adult social care was commissioned by First Minister Nicola Sturgeon in 2020, as a response to the damage to care homes caused by the COVID-19 pandemic in Scotland. This review was dubbed "The Feeley Review" after its author and chair Derek Feeley, the former chief executive of NHS Scotland, and was published in February 2021. The review recommended the establishment of a Scottish NCS on an equal footing with NHS Scotland, receiving centralised funding from the Scottish government. Health Secretary Jeane Freeman accepted the recommendation and the SNP promised to introduce the NCS as a "top priority" in government in its manifesto for the 2021 Scottish Parliament election, alongside the introduction of a national wage for care staff. It is planned that the new service will be fully operational in Scotland by 2026. Nationalising care homes is not part of the proposal, but it will mean ministers will get more power over social care. There is a pledge to make social care free at the point of use, although this will not include accommodation costs.

National Care Service (Scotland) Bill 
The National Care Service (Scotland) Bill was introduced to the Scottish Parliament on 20 June 2022. If passed, the Bill will establish the NCS in Scotland and give Scottish ministers the ability to transfer social care services, which in Scotland are currently maintained by local authorities, to the new care service. In the case of children's services, ministers would have to hold a public consultation to be able to transfer them to the NCS. Some health services which are currently maintained by NHS Scotland and its Health Boards could also be transferred should the Bill pass. NCS Care Boards would deliver care on a local level, although transferred services could also be delivered nationally. The NCS and NHS Scotland would also share information, carers would have a right to take breaks and the proposed "Anne's Law", a law which would entitle care home residents to meeting people important to them, would also be enacted in the Bill.

The Bill has been met with controversy. Scottish Labour called the SNP's plans to introduce the NCS "the biggest power grab in the history of Holyrood", with deputy leader Jackie Baillie claiming that it would endanger local authorities, adding that it was "not a National Care Service" but a "national commissioning service which can be used as a fig leaf for centralising power". Other opposition parties have raised concerns about the cost of the service, which is believed to have the possibility of redirecting nearly £1.3 billion of public money from frontline services to the NCS (£495 million for the overall service and another £726 million for its Care Boards). Trade unions GMB, Unison and Unite are also concerned about the centralisation of power away from local authorities that would be caused by the service, while the Convention of Scottish Local Authorities (COSLA) is currently taking "the time and consideration that is rightfully needed with legislation of this magnitude, to understand the breadth of the impact it will have on communities the length and breadth of Scotland".

Notes

References 

Social care in the United Kingdom